= Transcriptional adaptation =

Transcriptional adaptation is a recently described type of genetic compensation by which a mutation in one gene leads to the transcriptional modulation of related genes, termed adapting genes or modifiers.
